Lithium cyclopentadienide is an organolithium compound with the formula C5H5Li.  The compound is often abbreviated as LiCp, where Cp− is the cyclopentadienide anion. Lithium cyclopentadienide is a colorless solid, although samples often are pink owing to traces of oxidized impurities.

Preparation, structure and reactions
Lithium cyclopentadienide is commercially available as a solution in THF. It is prepared by treating cyclopentadiene with butyllithium:
C5H6  +  LiC4H9  →  LiC5H5  +  C4H10
Because lithium cyclopentadienide is usually handled as a solution, the solvent-free solid is rarely encountered.  According to X-ray crystallography,  LiCp is a "polydecker" sandwich complex, consisting of an infinite chain of alternating Li+ centers sandwiched between μ-η5:η5-C5H5 ligands.  In the presence of amines or ethers, LiCp gives adducts, e.g. (η5-Cp)Li(TMEDA). LiCp is a common reagent for the preparation of cyclopentadienyl complexes.

See also
Sodium cyclopentadienide

References

Cyclopentadienyl complexes
Non-benzenoid aromatic carbocycles
Organolithium compounds